The 1990 Grand Prix de Tennis de Toulouse was a men's tennis tournament played on indoor carpet courts in Toulouse, France that was part of the World Series of the 1990 ATP Tour. It was the ninth edition of the tournament and was held from 1 October until 7 October 1990. Eighth-seeded Jonas Svensson won the singles title.

Finals

Singles

  Jonas Svensson defeated   Fabrice Santoro, 7–6, 6–2

Doubles

 Neil Broad /  Gary Muller defeated  Michael Mortensen /  Michiel Schapers, 7–6, 6–4

References

External links
 ITF tournament edition details

Grand Prix de Tennis de Toulouse
Grand Prix de Tennis de Toulouse
Grand Prix de Tennis de Toulouse
Grand Prix de Tennis de Toulouse